Pseudotolida morimotoi is a beetle in the genus Pseudotolida of the family Mordellidae. It was described in 1967 by Nomura.

References

Mordellidae
Beetles described in 1967